Aingya is a village in the Sagaing Region of north-west Myanmar. It lies in Tantabin Township in the Myingyan District.

See also
List of cities, towns and villages in Burma: A

References

Populated places in Sagaing Region